James Craib (27 November 1917 – 19 December 1994) was an English cricketer. He played two first-class matches for Cambridge University Cricket Club in 1937.

See also
 List of Cambridge University Cricket Club players

References

External links
 

1917 births
1994 deaths
English cricketers
Cambridge University cricketers
Sportspeople from Kandy
British expatriates in Sri Lanka